Xanthostemon bracteatus is a species of plant in the family Myrtaceae, endemic to the Philippines.

References

Flora of the Philippines
bracteatus